Guram Sagaradze may refer to:
Guram Sagaradze (actor) (1929–2013), Georgian actor
Guram Sagaradze (wrestler) (born 1939), Georgian wrestler